El Battan is a town and commune in the Manouba Governorate, Tunisia. As of 2004 it had a population of 5,761.
Attached to the governorate of Manouba, it is a municipality with 5,761 inhabitants in 2004  and the capital of a delegation of 17,321 inhabitants.

El Batan is located at 36°48'13"N, 9°50'38"E, west of Tunis.

The city is in the center of a large plain where intensive irrigation is practiced. It is also known for the breeding of horses. There is a subsidiary of the National Foundation for the improvement of the horse race.  During the French protectorate, El Battan was a strategic location for the settlement of farmers. French-style houses still exist there.

A bridge of Roman origin allows travelers to cross the Medjerda.  Traditionally, washing and crushing of wool was practiced there, especially for the manufacture of the chechias.

See also
List of cities in Tunisia

References

Populated places in Tunisia
Communes of Tunisia